Denigomodu is a district in the western part of the island of Nauru. It is the most populous district in Nauru.

It houses the expatriate housing compound "The Location". This makes it Nauru's largest settlement by population.  25.7% of the people in Nauru live in Denigomodu.

Geography
The district, part of the constituency of Ubenide, covers an area of 1.18 km², and has a population of 2,827, making it the most populous of the fourteen Nauruan districts.

Local features
In this district is the laborers' settlement for the phosphate mining workers of the Nauru Phosphate Corporation (NPC). Also located in Denigomodu are:

 Republic of Nauru Hospital
 NPC planning and construction offices
 Eigigu Supermarket

Education

The primary and secondary schools serving all of Nauru are Yaren Primary School in Yaren District (years 1-3), Nauru Primary School in Meneng District (years 4-6), Nauru College in Denigomodu District (years 7-9), and Nauru Secondary School (years 10-12) in Yaren District.

Nauru College opened as the Denigomodu School in January 2000 as part of the Rehabilitation and Development Cooperation Agreement between Australia and Nauru, agreed in August 1993. As part of the agreement the governments decided to build Nauru College in March 1999. It was initially Nauru's third primary school, but it was transitioned into a junior high school with Form 1, as Nauruan children vie for scholarships at that educational stage. The government senior high school of the country is Nauru Secondary School in Yaren District.

The expatriate children in the Location settlement attend the Location School, years 1-8 as of April 2002; it is within the "Location" housing development. This is the only school in Nauru which is not English medium.

Notable people

Olympia Zacharias (b. 1986), 100m runner
Angelita Detudamo (b. 1986), tennis player
Joanne Gobure (b. 1982), poet

Economy 
Denigomodu is highly dependent on tourism; it is the largest city in Nauru. Despite its relative wealth and size in comparison to Yaren, Denigomodu is not considered the central capital of Nauru.

See also
 List of settlements in Nauru
 Rail transport in Nauru

References

External links

Districts of Nauru
Populated places in Nauru